Richard Wayne Moore (born December 5, 1952) is an American lawyer who served as the United States Attorney for the Southern District of Alabama from 2017 to 2021. Prior to assuming that role, he had served as the Inspector General for the Tennessee Valley Authority since 2003, when he was appointed by George W. Bush and confirmed by the United States Senate.

Education and career 
Moore received his Bachelor of Science, summa cum laude, from Spring Hill College in 1974 and his Juris Doctor from Cumberland School of Law in 1977. In 2015, Moore was named Cumberland School of Law's Distinguished Alumnus of the Year. From 1997 to 1998, Moore was an Atlantic Fellow in Public Policy at the University of Oxford. At Oxford, Moore conducted an independent study on the prosecution of complex international fraud cases.

Moore has practiced law in Mobile, Alabama and Cleveland, Ohio. He served as an Assistant United States Attorney for the Southern District of Alabama from 1985 to 2003. During this time, Moore served as chief of the criminal division, as senior litigation counsel, and as coordinator of the Anti-Terrorism Task Force.

Moore has served as the Inspector General for the Tennessee Valley Authority since 2003, when he was appointed by George W. Bush and confirmed by the United States Senate. From May 2009 to March 2011, Moore was the chairman of the investigations committee for the Council of Inspectors General on Integrity and Efficiency.

United States Attorney 
In June 2017, Moore was announced as Donald Trump's nominee to become the United States Attorney for the Southern District of Alabama. He was confirmed by voice vote on September 14, 2017. On February 8, 2021, he along with 55 other attorneys were asked to resign. On February 22, 2021, Moore announced his retirement effective February 26, 2021.

References

External links
 Moore Biography at U.S. Department of Justice

1952 births
21st-century American lawyers
Alabama lawyers
Assistant United States Attorneys
Cumberland School of Law alumni
Living people
People from Bartow, Florida
Spring Hill College alumni
United States Attorneys for the Southern District of Alabama